This list of museums in Queensland, Australia contains museums that are defined for this context as institutions (including nonprofit organizations, government entities, and private businesses) that collect and care for objects of cultural, artistic, scientific, or historical interest and make their collections or related exhibits available for public viewing. These also include non-profit art galleries and university art galleries. It covers museums in all local government areas in Queensland apart from those in the City of Brisbane.

Museums

Defunct museums
 Australian Motorcycle Museum, Haigslea, closed in 2014
 North Queensland Military Museum

See also

 List of museums in Australia
 List of museums in Brisbane

References

External links

 Museums and Galleries Services Queensland has a search facility for Queensland museums and galleries

Queensland

Queensland-related lists
Lists of buildings and structures in Queensland
Lists of tourist attractions in Queensland